The Beta Israel (Bēteʾ Yīsrāʾēl; , , modern Bēte 'Isrā'ēl, EAE: "Betä Ǝsraʾel", "House of Israel" or "Community of Israel"), also known as Ethiopian Jews (: Yehudey Etyopyah; Ge'ez: የኢትዮጵያ ይሁዲዎች, yä-Itəyop'əya Yəhudiwoč), are a Jewish community that developed and lived for centuries in the area of the Kingdom of Aksum and the Ethiopian Empire, which is currently divided between the modern-day Amhara and Tigray regions of Ethiopia. Most of the Beta Israel community immigrated to Israel in the late 20th century.

The Beta Israel lived in northern and northwestern Ethiopia, in more than 500 small villages which were spread over a wide territory, alongside populations that were predominantly Christian as well as Muslim. Most of them were concentrated mainly on what are today North Gondar Zone, Shire Inda Selassie, Wolqayit, Tselemti, Dembia, Segelt, Quara, and Belesa. They practice a non-Talmudic form of Judaism that is similar in some respects to Karaite Judaism. In Israel, this form of Judaism is referred to as Haymanot. Beta Israel appear to have been isolated from mainstream Jewish communities for at least a millennium. They suffered religious persecution and a significant portion of the community were forced into Christianity during the 19th and 20th centuries; those converted to Christianity came to be known as the Falash Mura. The larger Beta Abraham Christian community is also considered to have historical links to the Beta Israel.

The Beta Israel made contact with other Jewish communities in the later 20th century. Following this, a rabbinic debate ensued over whether or not the Beta Israel were Jews. After halakhic (Jewish law) and constitutional discussions, Israeli officials decided, in 1977, that the Israeli Law of Return was to be applied to the Beta Israel. The Israeli and American governments mounted aliyah (immigration to Israel) transport operations. These activities included Operation Brothers in Sudan between 1979 and 1990 (this includes the major Operation Moses and Operation Joshua), and in the 1990s from Addis Ababa (which includes Operation Solomon).

By the end of 2008, there were 119,300 people of Ethiopian descent in Israel, including nearly 81,000 people born in Ethiopia and about 38,500 native-born Israelis (about 32 percent of the community) with at least one parent born in Ethiopia or Eritrea (formerly part of Ethiopia). At the end of 2019, there were 155,300 people of Ethiopian descent in Israel. Approximately 87,500 were born in Ethiopia, and 67,800 were Israeli-born with fathers born in Ethiopia.

The Ethiopian Jewish community in Israel is mostly composed of Beta Israel (practicing both Haymanot and Rabbinic Judaism) and to a smaller extent of Falash Mura who converted from Christianity to Rabbinic Judaism upon their arrival to Israel.

Terminology 

Throughout its history, the community has been referred to by numerous names.

Originally, it did not have any negative connotations, and the community has since used Beta Israel as its official name. Since the 1980s, it has also become the official name used in the scholarly and scientific literature to refer to the community. The term Esra'elawi "Israelites" – which is related to the name Beta Israel – is also used by the community to refer to its members.

The name Ayhud ('Jews'), is rarely used in the community, as the Christians had used it as a derogatory term. The community has begun to use it only since strengthening ties with other Jewish communities in the 20th century. The term Ibrawi "Hebrew" was used to refer to the chawa ('free man') in the community, in contrast to barya ('slave'). The term Oritawi "Torah-true" was used to refer to the community members; since the 19th century, it has been used in opposition to the term Falash Mura (converts).

The derogatory term Falasha, which means 'landless', 'wanderers', 'associated with monks' was given to the community in the 15th century by the Emperor Yeshaq I, and today its use is avoided because its meaning is offensive. Zagwe, referring to the Agaw people of the Zagwe dynasty, among the original inhabitants of northwest Ethiopia, is considered derogatory, since it incorrectly associates the community with the largely pagan Agaw.

Religion

Haymanot (Ge'ez: ሃይማኖት) is the colloquial term for "faith" which is also used as a term for the Jewish religion by the Beta Israel community, and Ethiopian Orthodox Christians also use it as a term for their own religion.

Texts
Mäṣḥafä Kedus (Holy Scriptures) is the name for their religious literature. The language of the writings is Geʽez, which also is the liturgical language of the Ethiopian Orthodox Church. The holiest book is the Orit (meaning "law") or Octateuch: the Five Books of Moses plus Joshua, Judges and Ruth. The rest of the Bible has secondary importance. They possess the Book of Lamentations from the traditional Hebrew canon, as part of the Book of Jeremiah, as in the Orthodox Tewahedo biblical canon.

Deuterocanonical books that also make up part of the canon are Sirach, Judith, Esdras 1 and 2, the Books of Meqabyan, Jubilees, Baruch 1 and 4, Tobit, Enoch, and the testaments of Abraham, Isaac, and Jacob. Many of these books differ substantially from the similarly numbered and named texts in Koine Greek and Hebrew (such as "Maccabbees"), though some of the Ge'ez works are clearly dependent on those texts. Others appear to have other ancient literary and oral origins. All of the texts are also used by the Orthodox Christian population as well, though with varying levels of importance between the communities.

Important non-Biblical writings include: Mota Aron "Death of Aaron", Mota Musé "Death of Moses", Nagara Muse "The Conversation of Moses", Te'ezaza Sanbat "Commandments of the Sabbath", Arde'et "Disciples", Gorgorious, Barok "Apocalypse of Baruch", Mäṣḥafä Sa'atat "Book of Hours", Fālasfā "Philosophers", Abba Elias "Father Elijah", Mäṣḥafä Mäla'əkt "Book of Angels", Dərsanä Abrəham Wäsara Bägabs "Homily on Abraham and Sarah in Egypt", Gadla Sosna "The Story of Susanna", and Baqadāmi Gabra Egzi'abḥēr "In the Beginning God Created".

Prayer houses

The synagogue is called the masgid (place of worship), it is also called the bet maqdas (Holy house) or the ṣalot bet (Prayer house).

Dietary laws

Beta Israel kashrut law is based mainly on the books of Leviticus, Deuteronomy, and Jubilees. Permitted and forbidden animals and their signs appear in Leviticus 11:3–8 and Deuteronomy 14:4–8. Forbidden birds are listed in Leviticus 11:13–23 and Deuteronomy 14:12–20. Signs of permitted fish are written on Leviticus 11:9–12 and Deuteronomy 14:9–10. Insects and larvae are forbidden according to Leviticus 11:41–42. Gid hanasheh is forbidden per Genesis 32:33. Mixtures of milk and meat are not prepared or eaten, but benefiting from them are not banned either: Haymanot interpreted the verses Exodus 23:19, Exodus 34:26, and Deuteronomy 14:21 "shalt not seethe a kid in its mother's milk" literally, as in Karaite Judaism; whereas, under Rabbinic Judaism, any benefit from mixing dairy products with meat is banned.

Ethiopian Jews were forbidden to eat the food of non-Jews. A Kahen eats only meat he has slaughtered himself, which his hosts prepare both for him and themselves. Beta Israel who broke these taboos were ostracized, and had to undergo a purification process. Purification included fasting for one or more days, eating only uncooked chickpeas provided by the Kahen, and ritual purification before entering the village.

Unlike other Ethiopians, the Beta Israel do not eat raw meat dishes such as kitfo or gored gored.

Calendar and holidays
The Beta Israel calendar is a lunar calendar of 12 months, each 29 or 30 days alternately. Every four years, there is a leap year which adds a full month (30 days). The calendar is a combination of the ancient calendar of Alexandrian Jewry, Book of Jubilees, Book of Enoch, Abu Shaker, and the Ge'ez calendar. The years are counted according to the counting of Kushta: "1571 to Jesus Christ, 7071 to the Gyptians, and 6642 to the Hebrews"; according to this counting, the year 5771 in the Rabbinical Hebrew calendar is the year 7082 in this calendar.

Holidays in the Haymanot (religion) are divided into daily, monthly, and annually. The annual holidays by month are:

Nisan: ba'āl lisan (Nisan holiday – New Year) on 1, ṣomä fāsikā (Passover fast) on 14, fāsikā (Passover) between 15–21, and gadfat (grow fat) or buho (fermented dough) on 22.
Iyar: another fāsikā (Second Passover – Pesach Sheni) between 15–21.
Sivan: ṣomä mã'rar (Harvest fast) on 11 and mã'rar (Harvest – Shavuot) on 12.
Tammuz: ṣomä tomos (Tammuz fast) between 1–10.
Av: ṣomä ab (Av fast) between 1–17.
Seventh Sabbath: fixed as the fourth Sabbath of the fifth month.
Elul:  awd amet (Year rotate) on 1, ṣomä lul (Elul fast) between 1–9, anākel astar'i (our atonement) on 10 and asartu wasamantu (eighteenth) on 28.
Tishrei: ba'āl Matqe (blowing holiday – Zikhron Trua) on 1, astasreyo (Day of Atonement – Yom Kippur) on 10 and ba'āla maṣallat (Tabernacles holiday – Sukkot) between 15–21.
Cheshvan: holiday for the day Moses saw the face of God on 1, holiday for the reception of Moses by the Israelites on 10, fast on 12 and měhlělla (Supplication – Sigd) on 29.
Kislev: another ṣomä mã'rar and mã'rar on 11 and 12 respectively.
Tevet: ṣomä tibt (Tevet fast) between 1–10.
Shevat: wamashi brobu on 1.
Adar: ṣomä astēr (Fast of Esther – Ta'anit Ester) between 11–13.

Monthly holidays are mainly memorial days to the annual holiday; these are yačaraqā ba'āl ("new moon festival") on the first day of every month, asärt ("ten") on the tenth day to commemorate Yom Kippur, 'asrã hulat ("twelve") on the twelfth day to commemorate Shavuot, asrã ammest ("fifteen") on the fifteenth day to commemorate Passover and Sukkot, and ṣomä mälěya a fast on the last day of every month. Daily holidays include the ṣomä säňňo (Monday fast), ṣomä amus (Thursday fast), ṣomä 'arb (Friday fast), and the very holy Sanbat (Sabbath).

Culture

Languages 
The Beta Israel once spoke Qwara and Kayla, both of which are Agaw languages. Now, they speak Tigrinya and Amharic, both Semitic languages. Their liturgical language is Geʽez, also Semitic. Since the 1950s, they have taught Hebrew in their schools. Those Beta Israel residing in the State of Israel now use Modern Hebrew as a daily language.

Origins

Oral traditions
Contemporary scholars believe that the Beta Israel emerged comparatively recently and formed a distinct ethnonational group  in the context of historical  pressures that came to a head from the 14th to the 16th centuries.
Many of the Beta Israel's accounts of their own origins state that they stem from the very ancient migration of some portion of the Tribe of Dan to Ethiopia, were led by the sons of Moses, perhaps at the time of the Exodus. Alternative timelines include the later crises in Judea, e. g., the split of the northern Kingdom of Israel from the southern Kingdom of Judah after the death of King Solomon or the Babylonian Exile. Other Beta Israel take as their basis the Christian account of Menelik's return to Ethiopia. Menelik is considered the first Solomonic Emperor of Ethiopia, and is traditionally believed to be the son of King Solomon of ancient Israel, and Makeda, ancient Queen of Sheba (in modern Ethiopia). Though all the available traditions correspond to recent interpretations, they reflect ancient convictions. According to Jon Abbink, three different versions are to be distinguished among the traditions which were recorded by the priests of the community.

Companions of Menelik from Jerusalem
According to one account, the Beta Israel originated in the kingdom of Israel and they were the contemporaries rather than the descendants of King Solomon and Menelik.

Migrants by the Egyptian route
According to another account, the forefathers of the Beta Israel are supposed to have arrived in Ethiopia by coming from the North, independently from Menelik and his company:

Ethiopian national myth
The Ethiopian history described in the Kebra Nagast relates that Ethiopians are descendants of Israelite tribes who came to Ethiopia with Menelik I, alleged to be the son of King Solomon and the Queen of Sheba (or Makeda, in the legend) (see  and ). The legend relates that Menelik, as an adult, returned to his father in Jerusalem, and later resettled in Ethiopia. He took with him the Ark of the Covenant.

In the Bible, there is no mention that the Queen of Sheba either married or had any sexual relations with King Solomon (although some identify her with the "black and beautiful" in Song of Songs 1:5). Rather, the narrative records that she was impressed with Solomon's wealth and wisdom, and they exchanged royal gifts, and then she returned to rule her people in Kush. However, the "royal gifts" are interpreted by some as sexual contact. The loss of the Ark is not mentioned in the Bible. Hezekiah later makes reference to the Ark in 2 Kings 19:15.

The Kebra Negast asserts that the Beta Israel are descended from a battalion of men of Judah who fled southward down the Arabian coastal lands from Judea after the breakup of the Kingdom of Israel into two kingdoms in the 10th century BCE (while King Rehoboam reigned over Judah).

Although the Kebra Nagast and some traditional Ethiopian histories have stated that Gudit (or "Yudit", Judith; another name given her was "Esato", Esther), a 10th-century usurping queen, was Jewish, some scholars consider that it is unlikely that this was the case. It is more likely, they say, that she was a pagan southerner or a usurping Christian Aksumite Queen. However, she clearly supported Jews, since she founded the Zagwe dynasty, who governed from around 937 to 1270 CE. According to the Kebra Nagast, Jewish, Christian and pagan kings ruled in harmony at that time. Furthermore, the Zagwe dynasty claimed legitimacy (according to the Kebra Nagast) by saying it was descended from Moses and his Ethiopian wife.

Most of the Beta Israel consider the Kebra Negast to be legend. As its name expresses, "Glory of Kings" (meaning the Christian Aksumite kings), it was written in the 14th century in large part to delegitimize the Zagwe dynasty, to promote instead a rival "Solomonic" claim to authentic Jewish Ethiopian antecedents, and to justify the Christian overthrow of the Zagwe by the "Solomonic" Aksumite dynasty, whose rulers are glorified.  The writing of this polemic shows that criticisms of the Aksumite claims of authenticity were current in the 14th century, two centuries after they came to power. Many Beta Israel believe that they are descended from the tribe of Dan. Most reject the "Solomonic" and "Queen of Sheba" legends of the Aksumites.

Tribe of Dan
To prove the antiquity and authenticity of their claims, the Beta Israel cite the 9th-century CE testimony of Eldad ha-Dani (the Danite), from a time before the Zagwean dynasty was established. Eldad was a Jewish man of dark skin who appeared in Egypt and created a stir in that Jewish community (and elsewhere in the Mediterranean Jewish communities he visited) with claims that he had come from a Jewish kingdom of pastoralists far to the south. The only language Eldad spoke was a hitherto unknown dialect of Hebrew. Although he strictly followed the Mosaic commandments, his observance differed in some details from Rabbinic halakhah. Some observers thought that he might be a Karaite, although his practice also differed from theirs. He carried Hebrew books that supported his explanations of halakhah. He cited ancient authorities in the scholarly traditions of his own people.

Eldad said that the Jews of his own kingdom descended from the tribe of Dan (which included the Biblical war-hero Samson) who had fled the civil war in the Kingdom of Israel between Solomon's son Rehoboam and Jeroboam the son of Nebat, and resettled in Egypt. From there, they moved southwards up the Nile into Ethiopia. The Beta Israel say this confirms that they are descended from these Danites. Some Beta Israel, however, assert that their Danite origins go back to the time of Moses, when some Danites parted from other Jews right after the Exodus and moved south to Ethiopia.  Eldad the Danite speaks of at least three waves of Jewish immigration into his region, creating other Jewish tribes and kingdoms. The earliest wave settled in a remote kingdom of the "tribe of Moses": this was the strongest and most secure Jewish kingdom of all, with farming villages, cities and great wealth. Other Ethiopian Jews who appeared in the Mediterranean world over the succeeding centuries and persuaded rabbinic authorities there that they were of Jewish descent, and so could if slaves be ransomed by Jewish communities, join synagogues, marry other Jews, etc, also referred to the Mosaic and Danite origins of Ethiopian Jewry. The Mosaic claims of the Beta Israel, in any case, like those of the Zagwe dynasty, are ancient.

Other sources tell of many Jews who were brought as prisoners of war from ancient Israel by Ptolemy I and settled on the border of his kingdom with Nubia (Sudan). Another tradition asserts that the Jews arrived either via the old district of Qwara in northwestern Ethiopia, or via the Atbara River, where the Nile tributaries flow into Sudan. Some accounts specify the route taken by their forefathers on their way upriver to the south from Egypt.

Rabbinic views

As mentioned above, the 9th-century Jewish traveler Eldad ha-Dani claimed he descended from the tribe of Dan. He also reported other Jewish kingdoms around his own or in East Africa during this time. His writings probably represent the first mention of the Beta Israel in Rabbinic literature. Despite some skeptical critics, his authenticity has been generally accepted in current scholarship. His descriptions were consistent and even the originally doubtful rabbis of his time were finally persuaded. Specific details may be uncertain; one critic has noted Eldad's lack of detailed reference to Ethiopia's geography and any Ethiopian language, although he claimed the area as his homeland.

Eldad's was not the only medieval testimony about Jewish communities living far to the south of Egypt, which strengthens the credibility of his account. Obadiah ben Abraham Bartenura wrote in a letter from Jerusalem in 1488:

Rabbi David ibn Zimra of Egypt (1479–1573), writing similarly, held the Ethiopian Jewish community to be similar in many ways to the Karaites, writing of them on this wise:
   
...Lo! the matter is well-known that there are perpetual wars between the kings of Kush, which has three kingdoms; part of which belonging to the Ishmaelites, and part of which to the Christians, and part of which to the Israelites from the tribe of Dan. In all likelihood, they are from the sect of Sadok and Boethus, who are [now] called Karaites, since they know only a few of the biblical commandments, but are unfamiliar with the Oral Law, nor do they light the Sabbath candle. War ceases not from amongst them, and every day they take captives from one another...

In the same responsum, he concludes that if the Ethiopian Jewish community wished to return to rabbinic Judaism, they would be received and welcomed into the fold, just as the Karaites who returned to the teachings of the Rabbanites in the time of Rabbi Abraham ben Maimonides.

Reflecting the consistent assertions made by Ethiopian Jews they dealt with or knew of, and after due investigation of their claims and their own Jewish behaviour, a number of Jewish legal authorities, in previous centuries and in modern times, have ruled halakhically (according to Jewish legal code) that the Beta Israel are indeed Jews, the descendants of the tribe of Dan, one of the Ten Lost Tribes. They believe that these people established a Jewish kingdom that lasted for hundreds of years. With the rise of Christianity and later Islam, schisms arose and three kingdoms competed. Eventually, the Christian and Muslim Ethiopian kingdoms reduced the Jewish kingdom to a small impoverished section. The earliest authority to rule this way was the 16th-century scholar David ibn Zimra (Radbaz), who explained elsewhere in a responsum concerning the status of a Beta Israel slave:

In 1973, Ovadia Yosef, the Sephardi chief rabbi of Israel ruled, based on the writings of David ben Solomon ibn Abi Zimra and other accounts, that the Beta Israel were Jews and should be brought to Israel. Two years later this opinion was confirmed by a number of other authorities who made similar rulings, including the Ashkenazi chief rabbi of Israel Shlomo Goren. In 1977, the law was passed granting the right of return.

Some notable poskim (religious law authorities) from non-Zionist Ashkenazi circles, placed a safek (legal doubt) over the Jewish peoplehood of the Beta Israel. Such dissenting voices include Rabbi Elazar Shach, Rabbi Yosef Shalom Eliashiv, Rabbi Shlomo Zalman Auerbach, and Rabbi Moshe Feinstein. Similar doubts were raised within the same circles towards the Bene Israel and to Russian immigrants to Israel during the 1990s Post-Soviet aliyah.

In the 1970s and early 1980s, the Beta Israel were required to undergo a modified conversion ceremony involving immersion in a mikveh (ritual bath), a declaration accepting Rabbinic law, and, for men, a hatafat dam brit (symbolic recircumcision). Avraham Shapira later waived the hatafat dam brit stipulation, which is only a requirement when the halakhic doubt is significant. More recently, Shlomo Amar has ruled that descendants of Ethiopian Jews who were forced to convert to Christianity are "unquestionably Jews in every respect". With the consent of Ovadia Yosef, Amar ruled that it is forbidden to question the Jewishness of this community, pejoratively called Falash Mura in reference to their having converted.

Genetics

A number of DNA studies have been done on the Beta Israel.

Uniparental lineages
Genealogical DNA testing allows research into paternal (meaning only through fathers) and maternal (meaning only through mothers) ancestry.

According to Cruciani et al. (2002), haplogroup A is the most common paternal lineage among Ethiopian Jews. The clade is carried by around 41% of Beta Israel males, and is primarily associated with Nilo-Saharan and Khoisan-speaking populations. However, the A branches carried by Ethiopians Jews are principally of the A-Y23865 variety, which formed about 10,000 years ago and is localized to the Ethiopian highlands and the Arabian peninsula. The difference with the Khoisan is 54,000 years.

Additionally, around 18% of Ethiopian Jews are bearers of E-P2 (xM35, xM2); in Ethiopia, most of such lineages belong to E-M329, which has been found in ancient DNA isolated from a 4,500 year old Ethiopian fossil. Such haplotypes are frequent in Southwestern Ethiopia, especially among Omotic-speaking populations.

The rest of the Beta Israel mainly belong to haplotypes linked with the E-M35 and J-M267 haplogroups, which are more commonly associated with Cushitic and Semitic-speaking populations in Northeast Africa. Further analysis show that the E-M35 carried by Ethiopian Jews is primarily indigenous to the Horn of Africa rather than being of Levantine origin. Altogether, this suggests that Ethiopian Jews have diverse patrilineages indicative of indigenous Northeast African, not Middle Eastern, origin.

A 2011 mitochondrial DNA study focused on maternal ancestry sampling 41 Beta Israel found them to carry 51.2% macro-haplogroup L typically found in Africa. The remainder consisted of Eurasian-origin lineages such as 22% R0, 19.5% M1, 5% W, and 2.5% U. However, no identical haplotypes were shared between the Yemenite and Ethiopian Jewish populations, suggesting very little gene flow between the populations and potentially distinct maternal population histories. The maternal ancestral profile of the Beta Israel is similar to those of highland Ethiopian populations.

Autosomal ancestry
The Ethiopian Jews' autosomal DNA has been examined in a comprehensive study by Tishkoff et al. (2009) on the genetic affiliations of various populations in Africa. According to Bayesian clustering analysis, the Beta Israel generally grouped with other Cushitic and Ethiosemitic-speaking populations inhabiting the Horn of Africa.

A 2010 study by Behar et al. on the genome-wide structure of Jews observed that "Ethiopian Jews (Beta Israel) and Indian Jews (Bene Israel and Cochini) cluster with neighbouring autochthonous populations in Ethiopia and western India, respectively, despite a clear paternal link between the Bene Israel and the Levant. These results cast light on the variegated genetic architecture of the Middle East, and trace the origins of most Jewish Diaspora communities to the Levant."

The Beta Israel are autosomally closer to other populations from the Horn of Africa than to any other Jewish population, including Yemenite Jews. A 2012 study by Ostrer et al. concluded that the Ethiopian Jewish community was founded about 2000 years ago probably by only a relatively small number of Jews from elsewhere with local people joining to the community, causing Beta Israel to become genetically distant from other Jewish groups.

According to a 2020 study by Agranat-Tamir et al., the DNA of the Ethiopian Jews is mostly of East African origin, but about 20% of their genetic makeup is of Middle Eastern semitic people origin and shows similarity to modern Jewish and Arab populations and Bronze Age Canaanites.

Scholarly views

Early views
Early secular scholars considered the Beta Israel to be the direct descendant of Jews who lived in ancient Ethiopia, whether they were the descendants of an Israelite tribe, or converted by Jews living in Yemen, or by the Jewish community in southern Egypt at Elephantine. In 1829, Marcus Louis wrote that the ancestors of the Beta Israel related to the Asmach, which were also called Sembritae ("foreigners"), an Egyptian regiment numbering 240,000 soldiers and mentioned by Greek geographers and historians. The Asmach emigrated or were exiled from Elephantine to Kush in the time of Psamtik I or Psamtik II and settled in Sennar and Abyssinia. It is possible that Shebna's party from Rabbinic accounts was part of the Asmach.

In the 1930s, Jones and Monroe argued that the chief Semitic languages of Ethiopia may suggest an antiquity of Judaism in Ethiopia. "There still remains the curious circumstance that a number of Abyssinian words connected with religion, such as the words for Hell, idol, Easter, purification, and alms, are of Hebrew origin. These words must have been derived directly from a Jewish source, for the Abyssinian Church knows the scriptures only in a Ge'ez version made from the Septuagint."

Richard Pankhurst summarized the various theories offered about their origins as of 1950 that the first members of this community were

1980s and early 1990s
According to Jacqueline Pirenne, numerous Sabaeans left south Arabia and crossed over the Red Sea to Ethiopia to escape from the Assyrians, who had devastated the kingdoms of Israel and Judah in the 8th and 7th centuries BCE. She says that a second major wave of Sabeans crossed over to Ethiopia in the 6th and 5th centuries BCE to escape Nebuchadnezzar II.  This wave also included Jews fleeing from the Babylonian takeover of Judah. In both cases, the Sabeans are assumed to have departed later from Ethiopia to Yemen.

According to Menachem Waldman, a major wave of emigration from the Kingdom of Judah to Kush and Abyssinia dates to the Assyrian siege of Jerusalem in the beginning of the seventh century BCE. Rabbinic accounts of the siege assert that only about 110,000 Judeans remained in Jerusalem under King Hezekiah's command, whereas about 130,000 Judeans led by Shebna had joined Sennacherib's campaign against Tirhakah, king of Kush. Sennacherib's campaign failed and Shebna's army was lost "at the mountains of darkness", suggestively identified with the Simien Mountains.

In 1987, Steve Kaplan wrote:

Richard Pankhurst summarized the state of knowledge on the subject in 1992 as follows: "The early origins of the Falashas are shrouded in mystery, and, for lack of documentation, will probably remain so for ever."

Recent views
By 1994, modern scholars of Ethiopian history and Ethiopian Jews generally supported one of two conflicting hypotheses for the origin of the Beta Israel, as outlined by Kaplan:

 An ancient Jewish origin, together with conservation of some ancient Jewish traditions by the Ethiopian Church. Kaplan identifies Simon D. Messing, David Shlush, Michael Corinaldi, Menachem Waldman, Menachem Elon and David Kessler as supporters of this hypothesis.
 A late ethnogenesis of the Beta Israel between the 14th to 16th centuries, from a sect of Ethiopian Christians who took on Biblical Old Testament practices, and came to identify as Jews. Steven Kaplan supports this hypothesis, and lists with him G. J. Abbink, Kay K. Shelemay, Taddesse Tamrat and James A. Quirin. Quirin differs from his fellow researchers in the weight he assigns to an ancient Jewish element which the Beta Israel have conserved.

History

Immigration to Israel

Beta Israel Exodus 
The emigration of the Beta Israel community to Israel was officially banned by the Communist Derg government of Ethiopia during the 1980s, although it is now known that General Mengistu collaborated with Israel in order to receive money and arms in exchange for granting the Beta Israel safe passage during Operation Moses. Other Beta Israel sought alternative ways of immigration, via Sudan or Kenya.

Late 1979 – beginning of 1984 – Aliyah activists and Mossad agents operating in Sudan, including Ferede Aklum, called the Jews to come to Sudan where they would eventually be taken to Israel. Posing as Christian Ethiopian refugees from the Ethiopian Civil War, Jews began to arrive in the refugee camps in Sudan. Most Jews came from Tigray and Wolqayt, regions that were controlled by the TPLF, who often escorted them to the Sudanese border.  Small groups of Jews were brought out of Sudan in a clandestine operation that continued until an Israeli newspaper exposed the operation and brought it to a halt stranding Beta Israels in the Sudanese camps. In 1981, the Jewish Defense League protested the "lack of action" to rescue Ethiopian Jews by taking over the main offices of HIAS in Manhattan.
1983 – March 28, 1985 – In 1983 the governor of Gondar region, Major Melaku Teferra was ousted, and his successor removed restrictions on travel out of Ethiopia.  Ethiopian Jews, many by this time waiting in Addis Ababa, began again to arrive in Sudan in large numbers; and the Mossad had trouble evacuating them quickly. Because of the poor conditions in the Sudanese camps, many Ethiopian refugees, both Christian and Jewish,  died of disease and hunger. Among these victims, it is estimated that between 2,000 to 5,000 were Jews. In late 1984, the Sudanese government, following the intervention of the U.S, allowed the emigration of 7,200 Beta Israel refugees to Europe who then went on to Israel. The first of these two immigration waves, between 20 November 1984 and 20 January 1985, was dubbed Operation Moses (original name "The Lion of Judah’s Cub") and brought 6,500 Beta Israel to Israel. This operation was followed by Operation Joshua (also referred to as "Operation Sheba") a few weeks later, which was conducted by the U.S. Air Force, and brought the 494 Jewish refugees remaining in Sudan to Israel. The second operation was mainly carried out due to the critical intervention and pressure from the U.S.

Emigration via Addis Ababa 
1990–1991: After losing Soviet military support following the collapse of Communism in Central and Eastern Europe, the Ethiopian government allowed the emigration of 6,000 Beta Israel members to Israel in small groups, mostly in hope of establishing ties with the U.S, the allies of Israel. Many more Beta Israel members crowded into refugee camps on the outskirts of Addis Ababa, the capital of Ethiopia, to escape the civil war raging in the north of Ethiopia (their region of origin), and await their turn to immigrate to Israel.
May 24–25, 1991 (Operation Solomon): In 1991, the political and economic stability of Ethiopia deteriorated, as rebels mounted attacks against and eventually controlled the capital city of Addis Ababa. Worried about the fate of the Beta Israel during the transition period, the Israeli government, with the help of several private groups, resumed the migration. Over the course of 36 hours, a total of 34 El Al passenger planes, with their seats removed to maximize passenger capacity, flew 14,325 Beta Israel non-stop to Israel. 
1992–1999: During these years, the Qwara Beta Israel immigrated to Israel. Another 4,000 Ethiopian Jews who had failed to reach the assembly centre in Addis Ababa in time, were flown to Israel in subsequent months.
1997–present: In 1997, an irregular emigration began of Falash Mura, which was and still is mainly subject to political developments in Israel.
2018–2020: In August 2018, the Netanyahu government vowed to bring in 1,000 Falasha Jews from Ethiopia. In April 2019 an estimated 8,000 Falasha were waiting to leave EthiopiaOn February 25, 2020, 43 Falasah arrived in Israel from Ethiopia.
2021: On November 14, 2021, Falasha Jews in Israel stage a protest so their relatives left behind in Ethiopia can go to Israel. The same day the Israeli Government decided to permit 9,000 Falasha Jews to go to Israel. On November 29, 2021, the Israeli Government permitted 3,000 Falasha Jews to go to Israel. As of 2021, 1,636 Jews have gone up to Israel from Ethiopia.

The Falash Mura's difficulties in immigrating to Israel

In 1991, the Israeli authorities announced that the emigration of the Beta Israel to Israel was about to conclude, because almost all of the community had been evacuated. Nevertheless, thousands of other Ethiopians began leaving the northern region to take refuge in the government controlled capital, Addis Ababa, who were Jewish converts to Christianity and asking to immigrate to Israel. As a result, a new term arose which was used to refer to this group: "Falash Mura". The Falash Mura, who weren't part of the Beta Israel communities in Ethiopia, were not recognized as Jews by the Israeli authorities, and were therefore not initially allowed to immigrate to Israel, making them ineligible for Israeli citizenship under Israel's Law of Return.

As a result, a lively debate has arisen in Israel about the Falash Mura, mainly between the Beta Israel community in Israel and their supporters and those opposed to a potential massive emigration of the Falash Mura people. The government's position on the matter remained quite restrictive, but it has been subject to numerous criticisms, including criticisms by some clerics who want to encourage these people's return to Judaism.

During the 1990s, the Israeli government finally allowed most of those who fled to Addis Ababa to immigrate to Israel. Some did so through the Law of Return, which allows an Israeli parent of a non-Jew to petition for his/her son or daughter to be allowed to immigrate to Israel. Others were allowed to immigrate to Israel as part of a humanitarian effort.

The Israeli government hoped that admitting these Falash Mura would finally bring emigration from Ethiopia to a close, but instead prompted a new wave of Falash Mura refugees fleeing to Addis Ababa and wishing to immigrate to Israel. This led the Israeli government to harden its position on the matter in the late 1990s.

In February 2003, the Israeli government decided to accept Orthodox religious conversions in Ethiopia of Falash Mura by Israeli Rabbis, after which they can then immigrate to Israel as Jews. Although the new position is more open, and although the Israeli governmental authorities and religious authorities should in theory allow immigration to Israel of most of the Falash Mura wishing to do so (who are now acknowledged to be descendants of the Beta Israel community), in practice, however, that immigration remains slow, and the Israeli government continued to limit, from 2003 to 2006, immigration of Falash Mura to about 300 per month.

In April 2005, The Jerusalem Post stated that it had conducted a survey in Ethiopia, after which it was concluded that tens of thousands of Falash Mura still lived in rural northern Ethiopia.

On 14 November 2010, the Israeli cabinet approved a plan to allow an additional 8,000 Falash Mura to immigrate to Israel.

On November 16, 2015, the Israeli cabinet unanimously voted in favor of allowing the last group of Falash Mura to immigrate over the next five years, but their acceptance will be conditional on a successful Jewish conversion process, according to the Interior Ministry. In April 2016, they announced that a total of 10,300 people would be included in the latest round of Aliyah, over the following 5 years. By May 2021 300 Falasha had been brought to Israel joining 1,700 who had already immigrated; an estimated 12,000 more are in Ethiopia

Population

Ethiopian Jews in Israel

The Ethiopian Beta Israel community in Israel today comprises more than 159,500 people. This is a little more than 1 percent of the Israeli population. Most of this population are the descendants and the immigrants who came to Israel during Operation Moses (1984) and Operation Solomon (1991). Civil war and famine in Ethiopia prompted the Israeli government to mount these dramatic rescue operations. The rescues were within the context of Israel's national mission to gather diaspora Jews and bring them to the Jewish homeland. Some immigration has continued up until the present day. Today 81,000 Ethiopian Israelis were born in Ethiopia, while 38,500 or 32% of the community are native born Israelis.

Over time, the Ethiopian Jews in Israel moved out of the government owned mobile home camps which they initially lived in and settled in various cities and towns throughout Israel, with the encouragement of the Israeli authorities who grant new immigrants generous government loans or low-interest mortgages.

Similarly to other groups of immigrant Jews who made aliyah to Israel, the Ethiopian Jews have had to overcome obstacles to integrate into Israeli society. Initially the main challenges faced by the Ethiopian Jewish community in Israel arose from communication difficulties (most of the Ethiopian population could not read nor write in Hebrew, and many of the older members could not hold a simple conversation in Hebrew), and discrimination, including manifestations of racism, from some parts of Israeli society. Unlike Russian immigrants, many of whom arrived educated and skilled, Ethiopian immigrants  came from an impoverished agrarian country, and were ill-prepared to work in an industrialized country.

Over the years, there has been significant progress in the integration of young Beta Israels into Israeli society, primarily resulting from serving in the Israeli Defense Forces, alongside other Israelis their age. This has led to an increase in opportunities for Ethiopian Jews after they are discharged from the army.

Despite progress, Ethiopian Jews are still not well assimilated into Israeli-Jewish society. They remain, on average, on a lower economic and educational level than average Israelis. The rate of Ethiopians who have dropped out of school has increased dramatically as well as the rate of juvenile delinquency, and there are high incidences of suicide and depression among this community. Also, while marriages between Jews of different backgrounds are very common in Israel, marriages between Ethiopians and non-Ethiopians are not very common. According to a 2009 study, 90% of Ethiopian-Israelis – 93% of men and 85% of women, are married to other Ethiopian-Israelis. A survey found that 57% of Israelis consider a daughter marrying an Ethiopian unacceptable and 39% consider a son marrying an Ethiopian to be unacceptable. Barriers to intermarriage have been attributed to sentiments in both the Ethiopian community and Israeli society generally. A 2011 study showed that only 13% of high school students of Ethiopian origin felt "fully Israeli".

In 1996, an event called the "blood bank affair" took place that demonstrated the discrimination and racism against Ethiopians in Israeli society. Blood banks would not use Ethiopian blood out of the fear of HIV being generated from their blood. Discrimination and racism against Israeli Ethiopians is still perpetuated. In May 2015, Israeli Ethiopians demonstrated in Tel Aviv and Jerusalem against racism, after a video was released, showing an Israeli soldier of Ethiopian descent that was brutally beaten up by the Israeli police. Interviewed students of Ethiopian origin affirm that they do not feel accepted in Israeli society, due to a very strong discrimination towards them. Many scholars such as Ben-Eliezer have been exploring how the discrimination, cultural racism, and exclusion have resulted in metaphorically sending many of the new generation of Ethiopian Jews "back to Africa". They say this because many of the new generation have been reclaiming their traditional Ethiopian names, Ethiopian language, Ethiopian culture, and Ethiopian music.

Converts

Falash Mura 

Falash Mura is the name given to those of the Beta Israel community in Ethiopia who converted to Christianity under pressure from the mission during the 19th century and the 20th century. This term consists of Jews who did not adhere to Jewish law, as well as Jewish converts to Christianity, who did so either voluntarily or who were forced to do so.

Many Ethiopian Jews whose ancestors converted to Christianity have been returning to the practice of Judaism. The Israeli government can thus set quotas on their immigration and make citizenship dependent on their conversion to Orthodox Judaism.

Beta Abraham

Slaves 

Slavery was practiced in Ethiopia as in much of Africa until it was formally abolished in 1942. After the slave was bought by a Jew, he went through conversion (giyur), and became property of his master.

In popular culture
The 2005 Israeli-French film "Go, Live, and Become", directed by Romanian-born Radu Mihăileanu focuses on Operation Moses. The film tells the story of an Ethiopian Christian child whose mother has him pass as Jewish so he can immigrate to Israel and escape the famine looming in Ethiopia. The film was awarded the 2005 Best Film Award at the Copenhagen International Film Festival. 
 Several prominent musicians and rappers are of Ethiopian origin.
The plot of the 2019 American film Uncut Gems opens with Ethiopian Jewish miners retrieving an opal in Africa.
The 2019 film The Red Sea Diving Resort is loosely based on the events of Operation Moses and Operation Joshua in 1984-1985, in which the Mossad covertly evacuated Jewish Ethiopian refugees to Israel using a base at the once-abandoned holiday resort of Arous Village on the Red Sea coast of Sudan.
Israeli-born singer Eden Alene was set to represent Israel at the Eurovision Song Contest 2020 in Rotterdam, Netherlands. The chorus of her song "Feker Libi" featured lyrics in Amharic, Arabic and Hebrew. Due to the 2020 contest's cancellation, she represented Israel again in 2021 with the song "Set Me Free", placing 17th out of 26 in the final.

Monuments

National memorials to the Ethiopian Jews who died on their way to Israel are located in Kiryat Gat, and at the National Civil Cemetery of the State of Israel in Mount Herzl in Jerusalem.

Ethiopian Heritage Museum
In 2009, plans to establish an Ethiopian Heritage Museum dedicated to the heritage and culture of the Ethiopian Jewish community were unveiled in Rehovot. The museum will include a model of an Ethiopian village, an artificial stream, a garden, classrooms, an amphitheater, and a memorial to Ethiopian Zionist activists and Ethiopian Jews who died en route to Israel.

Café Shahor Hazak
Strong Black Coffee ("Café Shahor Hazak"; קפה שחור חזק) is an Ethiopian-Israeli hip hop duo. The duo were a nominee for the 2015 MTV Europe Music Awards Best Israeli Act award.

Falash Mura 
Falash Mura is the name given to those of the Beta Israel community in Ethiopia who converted to Christianity as a consequence of proselytization during the 19th and 20th centuries. This term consists of Beta Israel who did not adhere to Israelite law, as well as converts to Christianity, who did so either voluntarily or who were forced to do so.
.

They derive from the Beta Israel of Ethiopia, however, the Falash Mura converted to Christianity and are not considered under the Israeli Law of Return. Some have made it to Israel but many still reside in camps in Gondar and Addis Ababa, Ethiopia, waiting their status for Aliyah. Some Falash Mura have reverted to Judaism.

Terminology 
The original term that the Beta Israel gave to the converts was "Faras Muqra" ("horse of the raven") in which the word "horse" refers to the converts and the word "raven" refers to the missionary Martin Flad who used to wear black clothes. This term derived the additional names Falas Muqra, Faras Mura and Falas Mura. In Hebrew the term "Falash Mura" (or "Falashmura") is probably a result of confusion over the use of the term "Faras Muqra" and its derivatives and on the basis of false cognate it was given the Hebrew meaning Falashim Mumarim ("converted Falashas").

The actual term "Falash Mura" has no clear origin. It is believed that the term may come from the Agaw and means "someone who changes their faith."

History
In 1860, Henry Aaron Stern, a Jewish convert to Christianity, traveled to Ethiopia in an attempt to convert the Beta Israel community to Christianity.

Conversion to Christianity 
For years, Ethiopian Jews were unable to own land and were often persecuted by the Christian majority of Ethiopia. Ethiopian Jews were afraid to touch non-Jews because they believed non-Jews were not pure. They were also ostracized by their Christian neighbors. For this reason, many Ethiopian Jews converted to Christianity to seek a better life in Ethiopia. The Jewish Agency's Ethiopia emissary, Asher Seyum, says the Falash Mura "converted in the 19th and 20th century, when Jewish relations with Christian rulers soured. Regardless, many kept ties with their Jewish brethren and were never fully accepted into the Christian communities. When word spread about the aliyah, many thousands of Falash Mura left their villages for Gondar and Addis Ababa, assuming they counted."

In the Achefer woreda of the Mirab Gojjam Zone, roughly 1,000–2,000 families of Beta Israel were found. There may be other such regions in Ethiopia with significant Jewish enclaves, which would raise the total population to more than 50,000 people.

Return to Judaism 
The Falash Mura did not refer to themselves as members of the Beta Israel, the name for the Ethiopian Jewish community, until after the first wave of immigration to Israel. Beta Israel by ancestry, the Falash Mura believe they have just as much of a right to return to Israel as the Beta Israel themselves. Rabbi Ovadiah Yosef, a major player in the first wave of Beta Israel immigration to Israel, declared in 2002 that the Falash Mura had converted out of fear and persecution and therefore should be considered Jews.

Aliyah to Israel 
Today, Falash Mura who move to Israel must undergo conversion on arrival, making it increasingly more difficult for them to get situated into Israeli society. The Beta Israel who immigrated and made Aliyah through Operation Moses and Operation Solomon were not required to undergo conversion because they were accepted as Jews under the Law of Return.

On February 16, 2003, the Israeli government applied Resolution 2958 to the Falash Mura, which grants maternal descendants of Beta Israel the right to immigrate to Israel under the Israeli Law of Return and to obtain citizenship if they convert to Judaism.

Controversy 
Today, both Israeli and Ethiopian groups dispute the Falash Mura's religious and political status. The Israeli government fears that these people are just using Judaism as an excuse to leave Ethiopia in efforts to improve their lives in a new country. Right-wing member of the Israeli Knesset Bezalel Smotrich was quoted saying, "This practice will develop into a demand to bring more and more family members not included in the Law of Return. It will open the door to an endless extension of a family chain from all over the world," he wrote, according to Kan. "How can the state explain in the High Court the distinction it makes between the Falashmura and the rest of the world?" Although the government has threatened to stop all efforts to bring these people to Israel, they have still continued to address the issue. In 2018, the Israeli government allowed 1,000 Falash Mura to immigrate to Israel. However, members of the Ethiopian community say the process for immigration approval is poorly executed and inaccurate, dividing families. At least 80 percent of the tribe members in Ethiopia say they have first-degree relatives living in Israel, and some have been waiting for 20 years to immigrate.

Notable Beta Israelis
 Seble Wongel, Queen mother of the Abyssinian Empire
 Pnina Tamano-Shata, Minister of Aliyah and Integration in thirty-sixth government of Israel
 Eli Dasa, Israeli professional footballer
Sharon Shalom – Israeli Rabbi, lecturer and writer

Affiliated groups 
 Faras Muqra
 Maryam Wodet (The Lovers of Mary)
 Shamane
 Beta Abraham

See also 

 Abayudaya, a Jewish community that lives in Uganda
 Christianity in Ethiopia
 Ethiopia–Israel relations
 Groups claiming affiliation with Israelites
 History of the Jews in Africa
 House of Israel (Ghana)
 Igbo Jews (Nigeria)
 Israeli Jews
 Jewish diaspora
 Jewish ethnic divisions
 Jews of Bilad el-Sudan
 Lemba people, a Jewish community that is partially descended from Yemenite Jews and lives in Southern Africa
 Qemant people, a small subgroup of the Agaw people from Ethiopia, whose members traditionally practiced an early Hebraic religion
 Religion in Ethiopia

References

Further reading

General
 Michael Corinaldi, Jewish identity: the case of Ethiopian Jewry, Magnes Press, 1998, 
 Daniel Frieilmann, "The Case of the Falas Mura" in Tudor Parfitt & Emanuela Trevisan Semi (Editors), The Beta Israel in Ethiopia and Israel: Studies on Ethiopian Jews, Routledge, 1999, 
Steven Kaplan & Shoshana Ben-Dor (1988). Ethiopian Jewry: An Annotated Bibliography. Ben-Zvi Institute.
 Don Seeman, One People, One Blood: Ethiopian-Israelis and the Return to Judaism, Rutgers University Press, 2010, 

Early accounts
 James Bruce (1790). Travels to Discover the Source of the Nile.
 Johann Martin Flad, The Falashas (Jews) of Abyssinia, W. Macintosh, 1869
 Samuel Gobat, Journal of a three years' residence in Abyssinia: in furtherance of the objects of the Church Missionary Society, Hatchard & Son; and Seeley & Sons, 1834
 Henry Aaron Stern, Wanderings among the Falashas in Abyssinia: Together with Descriptions of the Country and Its Various Inhabitants, Wertheim, Macintosh, and Hunt, 1862
 Carl Rathjens (1921). Die Juden in Abessinien. W. Gente.

History
Abbink, Jon (1990). "The Enigma of Esra'el Ethnogenesis: An Anthro-Historical Study". Cahiers d'Etudes africaines, 120, XXX-4, pp. 393–449.
Avner, Yossi (1986). The Jews of Ethiopia: A People in Transition. Beth Hatefutsoth. 
Salo Wittmayer Baron (1983). A Social and Religious History of the Jews. Volume XVIII. 
Budge, E. A. Wallis (1932).  The Queen of Sheba and her only son Menelik, London.
Herman, Marilyn. "Relating Bet Israel history in its Ethiopian context:  Defining, Creating, Constructing Identity".  Review article of Quirin (1992) and Kaplan (1992).  "Journal of the Anthropological Society of Oxford".  Hilary 1996. 27:1.  47–59
Hess, Robert L. (1969). "Toward a History of the Falasha". Eastern African history. Praeger.
Isaac, Ephraim (1974). The Falasha: Black Jews of Ethiopia. Dillard University Scholar Statesman Lecture Series.
Jankowski, Alice (1987). Die Königin von Saba und Salomo, Hamburg, H. Buske Vlg.
 Steven Kaplan (1987), "The Beta Israel (Falasha) Encounter with Protestant Missionaries: 1860-1905", Jewish Social Studies 49 (1), pp. 27–42
Kaplan, Steven (1995). The Beta Israel (Falasha) in Ethiopia: From Earliest Times to the Twentieth Century. New York University Press. 
Kessler, David (1985). The Falashas: the Forgotten Jews of Ethiopia. Schocken Books. 
Kessler, David (1996). The Falashas: a short history of the Ethiopian Jews. Frank Cass. 
Marcus, Louis (1829). "Notice sur l'époque de l'établissement des Juifs dans l'Abyssinie". Journal Asiatique, 3.
Messing, Simon D. (1982). The Story of the Falashas "Black Jews of Ethiopia". Brooklyn. 
Eric Payne (1972), Ethiopian Jews: the story of a mission, Olive Press.
Rapoport, Louis (1980). The Lost Jews: Last of the Ethiopian Falashas. Stein and Day. 
Quirin, James A. (1992). The Evolution of the Ethiopian Jews: a History of the Beta Israel (Falasha) to 1920. University of Pennsylvania Press. 
 Don Seeman, "The Question of Kinship: Bodies and Narratives in the Beta Israel-European Encounter (1860-1920)", Journal of Religion in Africa, Vol. 30, Fasc. 1 (Feb., 2000), pp. 86–120
Shapiro, Mark (1987). "The Falasha of Ethiopia". The World and I. Washington Times Corp.
Weil, Shalva (2008) 'Jews in Ethiopia', in M.A. Erlich (ed.) Encyclopedia of the Jewish Diaspora, Santa Barbara, CA: ABC CLIO, 2: 467–475.
Weil, Shalva (2011) 'Ethiopian Jews' (165–166) in Judith Baskin (ed.) Cambridge Dictionary of Judaism and Jewish Culture, New York: Cambridge University Press

Religion
Jeffrey Lewis Halper (1966). The Falashas: An Analysis of Their History, Religion and Transitional Society. University of Minnesota. 1966
Kay Kaufman Shelemay (1989). Music, Ritual, and Falasha History . Michigan State University Press. 
Michael Corinaldi (1988). Jewish Identity: The Case of Ethiopian Jewry. The Magnes Press. 
Menahem Valdman (1985). The Jews of Ethiopia: the Beta Israel community. Ami-Shav.
Wolf Leslau (1951). Falasha Anthology. Yale University Press. 
Menachem Elon (1987). The Ethiopian Jews : a case study in the functioning of the Jewish legal system. New York University
Steven Kaplan (1988). "Falasha religion: ancient Judaism or evolving Ethiopian tradition?". Jewish Quarterly Review LXXXIX. Center for Advanced Judaic Studies, University of Pennsylvania.
 Emanuela Trevisan Semi, "The Conversion of the Beta Israel in Ethiopia: A Reversible "Rite of Passage"", Journal of Modern Jewish Studies 1 (1), 2002, pp. 90–103
Edward Ullendorff (1968). Ethiopia and the Bible. Oxford University Press. 

Aliyah
Jerry L. Weaver and Howard M. Lenhoff (2007). Black Jews, Jews, and Other Heroes: How Grassroots Activism Led to the Rescue of the Ethiopian Jews. Gefen Publishing House Ltd. 
Tudor Parfitt (1986). Operation Moses: the untold story of the secret exodus of the Falasha Jews from Ethiopia. Stein and Day. 
Claire Safran (1987). Secret exodus: the story of Operation Moses. Reader's Digest.
Stephen Spector (2005). Operation Solomon: The Daring Rescue of the Ethiopian Jews. Oxford University Press US. 
Shmuel Yilma (1996). From Falasha to Freedom: An Ethiopian Jew's Journey to Jerusalem. Gefen Publishing. House. 
Alisa Poskanzer (2000). Ethiopian exodus: a practice journal. Gefen Publishing House. 
Baruch Meiri (2001). The Dream Behind Bars: the Story of the Prisoners of Zion from Ethiopia. Gefen Publishing House. 
Asher Naim (2003). Saving the lost tribe: the rescue and redemption of the Ethiopian Jews. Ballantine Books. 
Micha Odenheimer& Ricki Rosen (2006). Transformations: From Ethiopia to Israel. Reality Check Productions. 
Gad Shimron (2007). Mossad Exodus: The Daring Undercover Rescue of the Lost Jewish Tribe. Gefen Publishing House. 
Gadi Ben-Ezer (2002). The Ethiopian Jewish exodus: narratives of the migration journey to Israel, 1977–1985. Routledge. 
Weil, Shalva 2012 "Longing for Jerusalem Among the Beta Israel of Ethiopia", in Edith Bruder and Tudor Parfitt (eds.) African Zion: Studies in Black Judaism, Cambridge: Cambridge Scholars Publishing, pp. 204–17.

Society
Marilyn Herman (2012).  "Gondar's Child:  Songs, Honor and Identity Among Ethiopian Jews in Israel".  Red Sea Press.    
Hagar Salamon (1999). The Hyena People: Ethiopian Jews in Christian Ethiopia. University of California Press. 
Kay Kaufman Shelemay & Steven Kaplan (2010). "Creating the Ethiopian Diaspora". Special issue of Diaspora – A Journal of Transnational Studies.
Daniel Summerfield (2003). From Falashas to Ethiopian Jews: the external influences for change c. 1860–1960. Routledge. 
Esther Hertzog (1999). Immigrants and bureaucrats: Ethiopians in an Israeli absorption center. Berghahn Books. 
Ruth Karola Westheimer & Steven Kaplan (1992). Surviving salvation: the Ethiopian Jewish family in transition. NYU Press. 
Tanya Schwarz (2001). Ethiopian Jewish immigrants in Israel: the homeland postponed. Routledge. 
Girma Berhanu (2001). Learning In Context: An Ethnographic Investigation of Meditated Learning Experiences Among Ethiopian Jews in Israel. Goteborg University Press. 
Teshome G. Wagaw (1993). For our soul: Ethiopian Jews in Israel. Wayne State University Press. 
Michael Ashkenazi & Alex Weingrod (1987). Ethiopian Jews and Israel. Transaction Publishers. 
Tudor Parfitt & Emanuela Trevisan Semi (1999). The Beta Israel in Ethiopia and Israel: studies on Ethiopian Jews. Routledge. 
Tudor Parfitt & Emanuela Trevisan Semi (2005). Jews of Ethiopia: the birth of an elite. Routledge. 
Emanuela Trevisan Semi & Shalva Weil (2011). Beta Israel: the Jews of Ethiopia and beyond History, Identity and Borders. Libreria Editrice Cafoscarina. 
Weil, Shalva 2012 'I am a teacher and beautiful: the feminization of the teaching profession in the Ethiopian community in Israel', in Pnina Morag- Talmon and Yael Atzmon (eds) Immigrant Women in Israeli Society, Jerusalem: Bialik Institute, pp. 207–23.  (Hebrew)

Other reading
Construction of Beta Israel Identity
Jewish Encyclopedia
The Jews of Ethiopia and their Names
Abstract of the Lucotte-Smets article.
History of Ethiopian Jews
A New Light for Ethiopian Jews at Tel Aviv University

External links

Beta Israel: Society and Culture – Ethiopian Jews
Ethiopian in the Net
Yopi – The Ethiopian Portal
Israel Association for Ethiopian Jews
Chassida Shmella – Ethiopian Jewish Community of North America
Jewish Agency for Israel

 
 
History of the Jews in Africa
Jewish Ethiopian history
Jewish ethnic groups
Habesha peoples